Antons is a Danish, Latvian and Swedish masculine given name that is a short form of Antonius in use in Denmark, Greenland, Sweden, and Latvia. It is also a surname. People with the name Antons include:

Given name

Antons Jemeļins (born 1984), Latvian footballer
Antons Justs (1931–2019), Latvian Roman Catholic bishop
Antons Kurakins (born 1990), Latvian footballer
Antons Sapriko (born 1980), Latvian businessman

Surname
Mārtiņš Antons (1888–1941), Latvian lawyer and politician

References

Danish masculine given names
Latvian masculine given names
Latvian-language masculine surnames
Swedish masculine given names